The 2007 Movistar Open was a professional men's tennis event on the 2007 ATP Tour in Viña del Mar, Chile, held from 29 January to 4 February 2007. It was the 15th edition of the tournament and was part of the ATP International Series of the 2007 ATP Tour. This was the second tournament of the season (alongside Adelaide, Delray Beach, Buenos Aires and Las Vegas) that implemented a 24-player round robin tournament for the singles competition, as part of the round-robin trials proposed during this season. Fifth-seeded Luis Horna won the singles title.

Singles main-draw entrants

Seeds 

 Rankings are as of January 22, 2007.

Other entrants 
The following players received wildcards into the main draw:
  Paul Capdeville
  Gustavo Kuerten

The following players received entry from the qualifying draw:
  Juan Pablo Guzmán
  Óscar Hernández
  Albert Portas

The following player received entry as a lucky loser:
  Diego Junqueira

Withdrawals
During the tournament
  Gastón Gaudio (left thigh) → replaced by Diego Junqueira

Retirements
  Sergio Roitman (adductor)

Doubles main-draw entrants

Seeds 

1 Rankings are as of January 22, 2007.

Other entrants 
The following pairs received wildcards into the main draw:
  Guillermo Hormazábal /  Hans Podlipnik
  Gustavo Kuerten /  Flávio Saretta

The following pair received entry as alternates:
  André Ghem /  Juan Antonio Marín

Withdrawals
Before the tournament
  Adrián García (back)
  Marc López (ankle) → replaced by André Ghem and/or Juan Antonio Marín

Finals

Singles

 Luis Horna defeated  Nicolás Massú 7–5, 6–3
 It was Horna's only title of the year and the 2nd of his career.

Doubles

 Paul Capdeville /  Óscar Hernández defeated  Álbert Montañés /  Rubén Ramírez Hidalgo 4–6, 6–4, [10–6]
 It was the only title in both players' careers.

References

External links
 ATP tournament profile

 
Sport in Valparaíso Region
Movistar Open